Master Po may refer to:
Master Po, a fictional character in the 1972 TV series Kung Fu
Po (Kung Fu Panda), the title character in the Kung Fu Panda franchise

See also
 Master (disambiguation)
 Po (disambiguation)